Edinoverie (literally “coreligionism”) is an arrangement between certain Russian Old Believer communities and the official Russian Orthodox Church, whereby such communities are treated as a part of the normative Church system while maintaining their own rites. Thus, they are often designated "Old Ritualists" (staroobryadtsy), as opposed to "Old Believers".

Meaning of the term 
The Russian word edinoverie may be a back-formation of edinovertsy (единоверцы; sometimes also transcribed Yedinovertsy), i.e. 'coreligionists' (literally, 'ones of the same faith'; the word is also used to refer to members of Edinoverie community). It may be interpreted as 'Unity in Faith', although perhaps a more precise meaning would be "Accepting [the Old-Rite Christians] as people of the same faith [by the Established Church]". 

More open-minded hierarchs of the State Church saw in the Edinoverie a mutual acceptance. In the words of Filaret, Metropolitan of Moscow, addressed to the Edinovertsy at the 1854 consecration of Saint Nicholas Church for them at Rogozhskoye Cemetery, «Вы единоверцы нам, а мы единоверцы вам» ("You are people of our faith, and we are people of your faith").

History 

Edinoverie arrangements began to appear in the last quarter of the 18th century, after more than a century of struggle between Russia's established Orthodox Church and various Old Believer groups, who did not recognise the changes to liturgy and the official translations of Scripture made under the leadership of Patriarch Nikon in the 1660s.

On the side of the established church, the initiators of Edinoverie are said to be Metropolitan Platon of Moscow (the senior hierarch of the Russian Orthodox Church) and Archbishop Nikifor, who was Archbishop first of Sloviansk and Kherson, and later of Astrakhan and Stavropol in South Russia.

Nikifor, when he began reaching out to Old Believers in 1780, was based in Poltava, the headquarters of what was then the Diocese of Sloviansk and Kherson, covering much of eastern Ukraine, and later to become the Diocese of Ekaterinoslav). When he visited a chapel of Popovtsy (Old Believers who had their own priests not recognised by the Church) in Elisavetgrad in July of that year, he offered them the possibility of giving their chapel official standing in the established Church, with a priest selected by the Old Believers themselves, and utilising the pre-Nikonian service books and rites. The offer was rejected by the Old Believers of Elisavetgrad, but later that month, many Old Believers in the village of Bolshaya Znamenka (in Melitopol uyezd) accepted a similar arrangement. In February 1781, an archbishop issued a letter, authorising them to set up a church legally and conduct services in accordance with traditional rites. That was done by consecrating as a church the wooden chapel that the Old Believers of Znamenka had built in 1776.

Nikifor's scheme of legalisation turned out to be so popular that soon enough not only did the Popovtsy begin to request legalisation, but also the Bespopovtsy (the priestless faction) began asking Nikifor to provide them with priests. One such Bezpopovtsy community was the village of Zlynka in 1782.

Outside of Ukraine, in the same year, the Old Believer merchants of Moscow and the Volga arranged similar legalization of the Upper-Isaac Skete (compound) in the Irgiz Rivers area of Saratov Governorate.

On the side of the Old Believers, the driving force of the Edinoverie compromise were Hieromonk Michael Kalmykov and the Monk Nikodim. 

Having learned of Nikifor's experiments in the South and the legalisation of the Irgiz community, Nikodim, with an agreement of many Popovtsy of the Starodub area, began to contact civil and ecclesiastical authorities with regards to the possibility of "legalising" the priests of the Popovtsy. After a number of rejections, he gained the support of Count Peter Rumyantsev-Zadunaisky in 1783. In the same year, his petition to Empress Catherine II of Russia was forwarded to the Holy Synod. In April 1784, by which time Kalmykov had died, the Empress issued a rescript, granting priests to Old Believers and allowing them to officiate according to the "Old Rites", but not providing for any bishops. Disappointed, Nikodim fell sick and died at the age of 39.

In August 1785, a government decree was promulgated, providing for the organization of "Old Believer" churches within the established Church, although they still were not to have their own bishops or any sort of organizational centre. Nevertheless, this point is usually considered the start of the Edinoverie scheme.

Catherine's successor, Paul I, was perhaps more interested than Catherine was, in the matter of integrating the Old Believers into the established church on acceptable terms. Legal priests were granted to the Old Believers of Kazan in 1796 and to those of Nizhny Novgorod in 1797. On March 12, 1798, the Emperor issued a decree, requiring all bishops to ordain priests for the Old Believers (using the "old" rite of ordination, acceptable to the flock), and permitting construction of Old Ritualist churches. 
The chief bishop of the established church, Metropolitan Platon of Moscow, wrote the "Eleven Articles of Edinoverie", the document regulating the "union" between the official church and the Old Believers. Although the Metropolitan's rules satisfied some of the wishes of the Old Believers, the Edinoverie parishioners nevertheless remained second-class citizens within the Church: for example, the Old-Rite priests were still normally not permitted to administer sacraments to the mainstream Orthodox believers.

Throughout the 19th century, the attitude of the established church toward the Edinoverie may be described as that of tolerating a "necessary evil": a tool to bring the "dissenters" into the fold of the Mother Church. On occasions, Church authorities were quite forceful in converting Old Believer communities into the Edinoverie scheme, and the government would usually treat those within the arrangement preferentially over those who rejected the compromise. For example, in 1818 the government prohibited the printing of Old Ritualist religious books other than those from Edinoverie printing houses. At the same time, parishioners of "regular" Orthodox churches were discouraged by the authorities from joining Old-Rite parishes.

By the time of the Revolution of 1917, there were around 300 Edinoverie parishes in Russia.

In the capital of the Empire, Saint Petersburg, the first Edinoverie church was set up in 1799. In 1917, the Edinovertsy of Saint Petersburg received their first bishop (Bishop Simon of Okhta), but in 1932 their churches were closed by the Communist authorities, not to be revived until 1990. The Moscow community of Edinovertsy, based in Lefortovo District, were allowed to erect their churches after the Fire of 1812; two extant churches, completed in 1819 and 1825, which were shut down in 1931, and are now operated by the State Russian Orthodox Church.

Old Ritualists in Communion with the See of Rome
Some Old Believers have been received into communion with the Catholic Church as Eastern Catholics while maintaining their distinctive rites, thus making them Eastern Catholic equivalents of the Edinoverie. The most famous convert is Potapy Emelianov, a former Edinoverie priest in Luhansk Oblast, Ukraine. In 1918, he was received into the Russian Catholic Church with his entire parish. He later survived a ten-year sentence at Solovki prison camp and died in 1936. , his cause for canonisation is open.

According to a 2005 interview, Russian Catholic priest Sergei Golovanov stated that there was then one Old-Ritualist Catholic priest active on Russian soil.

References

Bibliography

 White, James: A Bridge to the Schism. Edinoverie, Russian Orthodoxy, and the Ritual Formation of Confessions, 1800-1918. (PhD thesis, European University Institute, 2014) 

Old Believer movement
18th-century Eastern Catholicism
18th-century Eastern Orthodoxy
Catholicism and Eastern Orthodoxy
Eastern Orthodox ecumenical and interfaith relations